LCD Soundsystem is the debut studio album by American rock band LCD Soundsystem. It was released on January 24, 2005, jointly through DFA and Capitol Records in the United States and EMI elsewhere. The album encompasses genres that range from dance-punk to electronica to indie rock to dance music. The album was critically acclaimed upon release and was nominated for the 2006 Grammy Award for Best Electronic/Dance Album. Many singles were released to promote the album, including the band's breakout "Daft Punk Is Playing at My House", which reached number one on the UK Dance Chart in March, 2005.

Reception

LCD Soundsystem received widespread acclaim from music critics. At Metacritic, which assigns a normalised rating out of 100 to reviews from mainstream critics, the album received an average score of 86, based on 35 reviews.

Andy Kellman of AllMusic wrote that LCD Soundsystem "has few weak spots and unfolds smoothly as you listen to it from beginning to end." In his review for Rolling Stone, Barry Walters said that the album showed that LCD Soundsystem were "both underground hitmakers and bona fide album artists." Drowned in Sound critic Gareth Dobson called it "a disparate yet cohesive collection of songs" and said that "the majority of LCD Soundsystem is an excellent thump into 2005." Simon Reynolds, writing in Blender, wrote that the album's "influences meld to form a seductive — if clearly deeply conflicted — self." While expressing disappointment that the album did not fully meet the expectations set by the band's early singles and lacked "very many surprises here, either in the bank of sounds Murphy pulls out, or in how he uses them", Dominique Leone of Pitchfork went on to award LCD Soundsystem the website's "Best New Music" accolade, though still concluding that it contained "plenty of good-not-great stuff" and was "a tad unfocused". Assigning the album a one-star honorable mention rating, Robert Christgau of The Village Voice noted Murphy's alternation between "dance guy or rock guy, optimist or cynic".

PopMatters Matt Cibula praised the inclusion of the second disc of previously released material, but stated that "the real gems are to be found on the new stuff" and called LCD Soundsystem "a great record." Rob Ortenzi of Alternative Press described LCD Soundsystem as "an album that will survive the fleeting tastes of cosmopolitan hipsters" and stated that "in two records' time, Murphy will be as respected as The Sugarhill Gang, Brian Eno and Suicide." No Ripcords Ben Bollig said that the album had "all the makings of a modern classic" and that "LCD Soundsystem is knowing and knowledgeable, inspired and inspirational. Intellectual without being snotty, encyclopaedic yet accessible, it takes the seemingly stalled electro model and kick-starts it into outer space."

Accolades
Online music magazine Pitchfork placed LCD Soundsystem at number 113 on their list of top 200 albums of the 2000s. It was also named the fifth best album of the decade by Resident Advisor. No Ripcord placed it at number 63 on their list of the Top 100 Albums of 2000–2009.

Track listing

Personnel

Musicians
James Murphy – most sounds
Tim Goldsworthy – other sounds
Eric Broucek – other sounds
Tyler Pope – other sounds
Nancy Whang – other sounds
Patrick Mahoney – other sounds
Mandy Coon – other sounds

Production
The DFA – production, mixing
Andy Wallace – mixing
Alan Douches – mastering
Eric Broucek – assistance
Ian Hatton – engineering and programming assistance
Mike Lapierre – engineering and programming assistance
Steve Sisco – engineering and programming assistance
Josh Wilbur – engineering and programming assistance
John O'Mahony – engineering and programming assistance
Michael Vadino – art direction and design
James Murphy – art direction and design

Charts
As of January 2016, the album has sold about 147,000 copies in United States, according to Nielsen SoundScan. About 91,400 of those are physical copies, and about 55,100 of those are digital copies.

Weekly charts

Year-end charts

Certifications

Notes

References

External links

LCD Soundsystem albums
2005 debut albums
DFA Records albums
Albums recorded at Long View Farm